What Every Woman Wants is a 1954 British comedy film directed by Maurice Elvey and starring William Sylvester, Elsie Albiin, Brenda De Banzie and Patric Doonan. It also features Brian Rix and Prunella Scales. It was based on a play Relations Are Best Apart by Edwin Lewis. It was shot at Walton Studios outside London. The film's sets were designed by the art director John Stoll.

Premise
A newly married couple have to live with the wife's parents and extended family in a small overcrowded house in the English Midlands.

Cast
 William Sylvester as Jim Barnes
 Elsie Albiin as Jane 
 Brenda De Banzie as Sarah
 Patric Doonan as Mark
 Dominic Roche as Bill
 Joan Hickson as Polly Ann
 Brian Rix as Herbert
 Joan Sims as Doll
 Beckett Bould as Tom
 Prunella Scales as Mary
 Douglas Ives as Sam
 Edwin Richfield as Frank

Critical reception
TV Guide rated the film two out of five stars, and noted "a realistic drama," in which,"housing shortages and unemployment, both delicate problems in England at the time, are treated in an effective, unpreachy manner."

References

External links

1954 films
1954 comedy films
1950s English-language films
Films directed by Maurice Elvey
British comedy films
Films with screenplays by Talbot Rothwell
British black-and-white films
Films set in England
Films shot at Nettlefold Studios
1950s British films